Carlos Adriano de Souza Vieira or simply Adriano Gabiru (born 11 August 1977 in Maceió), is a retired Brazilian attacking midfielder.

He was member of the Brazil national team in qualifying at the 2000 Summer Olympics and 2003 FIFA Confederations Cup.

In December 2006 he scored the game-winning and only goal in a 1–0 victory for Internacional against Spanish side FC Barcelona for the FIFA Club World Cup crown in Japan.

Honours

Club
Atlético-PR
 Campeonato Alagoano: 1998
 Campeonato Paranaense: 1998, 2000, 2001, 2002
 Campeonato Brasileiro Série A: 2001

Internacional
 Copa Libertadores da América: 2006
 FIFA Club World Cup: 2006

External links

1977 births
Brazilian footballers
Brazil international footballers
2003 FIFA Confederations Cup players
Living people
Club Athletico Paranaense players
Cruzeiro Esporte Clube players
Sport Club Internacional players
Olympique de Marseille players
Centro Sportivo Alagoano players
Sport Club do Recife players
Figueirense FC players
Mixto Esporte Clube players
J. Malucelli Futebol players
Campeonato Brasileiro Série A players
Ligue 1 players
Brazilian expatriate footballers
Expatriate footballers in France
People from Maceió
Association football midfielders
Sportspeople from Alagoas